Critical density may refer to:

 Critical density (cosmology), the matter density of a spatially flat Universe
 Critical density (thermodynamics), the density of a substance at its thermodynamic critical point
 Critical plasma density, the density at which the plasma frequency equals the frequency of an electromagnetic electron wave in plasma